Mühlenau (also: Rellau) is a river of Schleswig-Holstein, Germany, tributary of the Pinnau in Pinneberg.

See also
List of rivers of Schleswig-Holstein

Rivers of Schleswig-Holstein
Rivers of Germany